The African Journal of Neurological Sciences is a biannual peer-reviewed medical journal published by the Pan African Association of Neurological Sciences, covering all aspects of neurology. The editor-in-chief is Gilbert Dechambenoit. The journal is abstracted and indexed in Scopus.

References

External links 
 
 African Journal of Neurological Sciences at African Journals OnLine
 Pan African Association of Neurological Sciences

Publications established in 1982
Neurology journals
Biannual journals
Multilingual journals